Comber Whiskey was an Irish whiskey distilled in Comber, County Down, Northern Ireland. The whiskey was last distilled in 1956. However, some reserves were discovered and bottled in the 1980s as "Old Comber" and some of these bottles occasionally come up for sale.

Comber Distilleries was established in 1825. At the time of its closure, it was the last pot still in Northern Ireland. The Comber Tandoori Indian restaurant on Killinchy Street in the town occupies the last remaining Comber Distilleries building.

External links
Comber Historical Society article

Irish whiskey
Cuisine of Northern Ireland
Distilled drinks from Northern Ireland
Whiskey